Kétbodony is a village in Nógrád County, Hungary, with 438 inhabitants as of 2014.

Populated places in Nógrád County